Varmaland ("warm land") is a village in Stafholtstungur, in the Borgarfjörður region of Iceland.  Varmaland is known as an eco-friendly producer of various kinds of vegetables, plants and flowers. These are grown in green houses which make use of local renewable energy in the form of hot water generated from nearby geothermal sources in the form of springs and geysers. Along with electric power generated in local plants that make use of this same geothermal power, the green house farmers manage to make up for much of the loss of daylight during the darker winter months.

For many years Varmaland was also a Women's college and center for teaching of cookery and domestic skills for young aspiring home makers. Spread across the Varmaland grounds and college lawns are a variety of geothermal spring openings and geysers set in low mounds. The three biggest geysers are Veggjalaug, Minnihver and Kvennaskólahver, all of which have had their geothermal power harnessed for use of their very hot water as well as for the central heating of the Varmaland swimming pool, community center, college and, of course the local green houses.

References

External links 
 University of Iceland: Varmaland
 Varmaland photos on Flickr

Populated places in Iceland
Populated places in Western Region (Iceland)